Vinarje is a dispersed settlement in the hills north of Maribor in northeastern Slovenia. It belongs to the City Municipality of Maribor.

References

External links
Vinarje on Geopedia

Populated places in the City Municipality of Maribor